Scorched Earth: Australia's Secret Plan for Total War is a 2017 history book written by Sue Rosen. It covers secret Australian planning in response to a feared Japanese invasion of Australia during World War II.

References 

Allen & Unwin books
History books about World War II
2017 non-fiction books
Australian non-fiction books